Ian Richard Ainslie is a South African Olympic sailor, who specialized in the Finn class boats. Ainslie took part in three Olympic Games – Barcelona (1992), Atlanta (1996) and Sydney (2000). He won the 2001 J/22 World Championships.

He sailed for Team Shosholoza in the 2007 Louis Vuitton Cup.

References

1967 births
Living people
Olympic sailors of South Africa
South African male sailors (sport)
Sailors at the 2000 Summer Olympics – Finn
Sailors at the 1992 Summer Olympics – Finn
Sailors at the 1996 Summer Olympics – Finn
2007 America's Cup sailors